Thomas W. Pugh (born August 1949) is a Minnesota politician, a former member of the Minnesota Public Utilities Commission, and a former minority leader of the Minnesota House of Representatives.

Early life
Pugh received his undergraduate degree from Dartmouth College in Hanover, New Hampshire, graduating cum laude. He went on to receive his juris doctor from the University of Minnesota Law School. After graduating, he went into private practice with the South St. Paul law firm of Thuet, Pugh, Rogosheske, and Atkins.

Career
A Democrat, Pugh was first elected to the House in 1989, representing the South St. Paul area of Dakota County. After the DFL Party lost its legislative majority in the 1998 election, he was elected by his caucus to serve as Minority Leader, a position he held until 2003.

In August 2004, Pugh was appointed to the Minnesota Public Utilities Commission by Republican Governor Tim Pawlenty. He was reappointed to the commission in January 2005. His term expired in January 2011.

References

External links

1949 births
Living people
Democratic Party members of the Minnesota House of Representatives
Dartmouth College alumni
University of Minnesota Law School alumni
American Lutherans
21st-century American politicians
People from South St. Paul, Minnesota